Elsbethen is a municipality in the district of Salzburg-Umgebung in the Austrian state of Salzburg.

Geography 
The town lies directly south of the federal state capital, Salzburg, and borders Flachgau. Parts of the town have become infrastructurally connected with Salzburg.

The highest points in the Elsbethen area are the Schwarzenberg, the Gurlspitze and the Mühlstein.

History 
Elsbethen was first mentioned in 930 as Campanuaua. After the Second World War Glasenbach was home to an Allied POW camp, where members of Nazi organizations and war criminals were held.

Politics 
The mayor of Elsbethen is the graduate engineer Franz Tiefenbacher (ÖVP),
the vice mayors are Edi Knoblechner (SPÖ) and Sebastian Haslauer (ÖVP).

Buildings 

The most famous building in Elsbethen is Schloss Goldenstein, which serves today as a private girls' school, attended at one time by Romy Schneider. Next to Schloss Goldenstein is the gothic Elsbethen church.

Transit 
Elsbethen lies directly on the route of the Salzburg-Tyrol train, and has its own station. As well, there is the Salzburg-Sud station in Glasenbach.

References

External links

Cities and towns in Salzburg-Umgebung District